S. A. Chinne Gowda is an Indian film producer and distributor of Kannada films.

Personal details

Gowda was born in Saligrama to Appaji Gowda and Lakshmamma. He married Jayamma and has two sons. Jayamma is also a film producer who produced movies like sevanthi sevanthi. Both of his sons -- Sri Murali and Vijay Raghavendra are film actors.

Parvathamma Rajkumar, his elder sister, and his other two brothers - S.A. Govindaraj and S.A. Srinivas -, are also producers in Kannada film industry.

He worked as treasurer and vice-president for Karnataka Film Chamber of Commerce - KFCC.

Filmography

 Jagamechida Huduga in 1983 with Shiv Rajkumar in a lead role.
 Jwalamukhi with Rajkumar in a lead role under the direction of Singeetam Srinivasa Rao in 1985.
 Manamecchida Hudugi in 1987 with Shiv Rajkumar in a lead role.
 Rupayi Raja with Jaggesh in a lead role.
 Sri Harikathe with his younger son Sri Murali in a lead role.

References

External links
 Movie:Rupayi Raja - Producer : S.A.Chinne Gowda - on YouTube 
 Kannada film directory - Film producer S A Chinne Gowda released the directory at a simple function in the City recently. - on Deccan Herald 
 SP Varadaraju Awards Presented - SA Chinne Gowda brother of Smt Parvathamma Rajakumar
 Smt Lakshmamma - Smt Parvathamma Rajakumar, Jayamma, Nagamma and Hemavathi are the daughters while SA Chinne Gowda, SA Srinivas and SA Govindaraj are sons.

Film producers from Bangalore
Kannada film producers
Living people
Year of birth missing (living people)
Indian film producers